All Night Wrong is the first official live album by guitarist Allan Holdsworth, released in 2002 through Sony Music Entertainment Japan and in 2003 through Favored Nations Entertainment (United States).

Track listing

Personnel
Allan Holdsworth – guitar
Chad Wackerman – drums
Jimmy Johnson – bass

Technical
Yoshihiro Suzuki – engineering
Hiroyuki Shiotsuki – engineering
Mitsuru Kasai – engineering
Hideyasu Hatagoshi – engineering
Akinori Kikuchi – engineering
Koji Suzuki – mastering
Akira Yoda – production
Hiroya Tsubaki – production
Yasohachi Itoh – executive production

References

External links
In Review: Allan Holdsworth "All Night Wrong" at Guitar Nine Records

Allan Holdsworth albums
2003 live albums
Sony Music Entertainment Japan albums
Favored Nations live albums